Leslie King-Hammond (born 1944) is an American artist, curator and art historian who is the Founding Director of the Center for Race and Culture at the Maryland Institute College of Art, where she is also Graduate Dean Emeritus.

Biography
King-Hammond received a BFA degree from the City University of New York, Queens College, and a PhD in art history from Johns Hopkins University. She is chair of the board of the Reginald F. Lewis Museum of Maryland African American History & Culture. Hammond has curated several exhibitions, including the Global Africa Project, that was co-organized with Lowery Stokes Sims, Ph.D., Charles Bronfman International Curator at New York City's Museum of Arts and Design.

In explaining her role and her work, King-Hammond has said:

The intent of my professional activities in the art world at large has centered on facilitating the means to get artists of color and women more ideally represented in the larger arena... My efforts have focused on the redefinition of history as it more correctly profiles the role of the artists in America.

King-Hammond has interviewed other notable artists including Joyce J. Scott. The educator Lawrence Rinder conducted research on art and design from leading schools and spotlights the importance of education, the field of study and instructors and notes King-Hammond. Dr. King-Hammond was also noted as an expert in an article written by Blake Gopnik in The Washington Post.

Awards, honors
King-Hammond was awarded the Kress Fellowship in 1974, a competitive fellowship given to  curators and historians at the beginning of their careers. While at the Maryland Institute College for Art, King Hammond earned the Trustee Award for Excellence in Teaching in 1986. She received Mellon Grants for faculty research in 1988, 1989, and 2005.  She was awarded a Lifetime Achievement Award from the Studio Museum in Harlem (NYC) in 2002; an artist grant from the National Endowment for the Arts in 2001, an Andy Warhol Foundation curatorial fellowship in 2008, and the Alain Locke International Prize in 2010.

Bibliography

Exhibitions

References

1944 births
Living people
African-American women writers
American women artists
Johns Hopkins University alumni
Maryland Institute College of Art faculty
Queens College, City University of New York alumni
Women art historians
African-American writers
American women academics
21st-century African-American people
21st-century African-American women
20th-century African-American people
20th-century African-American women
American women curators
American curators